is a Japanese curler.  She currently plays lead for Team Loco Solare, which is skipped by Satsuki Fujisawa. The team won the bronze medal at the 2018 Winter Olympics and the silver medal at the 2022 Winter Olympics.

Career
Yoshida was a member of a team, "Tokoro Junior High school Robins", with Chinami Yoshida, Yumi Suzuki, and Kaho Onodera. They were the Hokkaido representative at the Japan Curling Championships, where they ranked third in both 2006 and 2007.

Yoshida and teammates Mari Motohashi and Yumi Suzuki added former skip Chinami Yoshida to their team at third for the 2014–15 season. With the team, she won her first World Curling Tour title at the 2014 Avonair Cash Spiel. Later that season, at the national championships, they lost the final against the Ogasawara rink to miss a berth to the world championships.

In May 2015, the Motohashi rink added Satsuki Fujisawa, a four-time Japanese champion skip. Motohashi moved from skip to alternate because of her pregnancy, and Fujisawa took over the rink of third Chinami Yoshida, second Yumi Suzuki, and led Yurika Yoshida. During the 2015-16 season, her team of Satsuki Fujisawa, Chinami Yoshida, Yumi Suzuki, and Mari Motohashi had success internationally as Japan's national team, winning gold at the 2015 Pacific-Asia Curling Championships and a silver at the 2016 World Women's Curling Championship, which was Japan's first-ever world championship medal. Meanwhile, domestically, Yoshida with the team won her first national championship title at the 2016 Japan Curling Championships. The team would win a bronze medal at the 2016 Pacific-Asia Curling Championships and a silver at the 2017 Pacific-Asia Curling Championships. They also won a bronze medal at the 2017 Asian Winter Games.

Yoshida was part of the Japanese team that won the 2018 Olympics women curling bronze medal.

Yoshida again represented Japan at the 2018 Pacific-Asia Curling Championships. Her team went an undefeated 6–0 record in the round robin but lost to the Koreans (skipped by Kim Min-ji) in the final. The next month, she represented Japan in the second leg of the 2018–19 Curling World Cup in Omaha, United States, which her team would end up winning, this time defeating Kim and her South Korean rink in the final.

Team Fujisawa began the 2019–20 season at the 2019 Hokkaido Bank Curling Classic, where they lost in the final to Jiang Yilun. Next, they won the ADVICS Cup. They had two more playoff appearances at their next two events, the Booster Juice Shoot-Out and the 2019 Colonial Square Ladies Classic, where they had semifinal and quarterfinal finishes, respectively. Next, they had a semifinal finish at the 2019 Curlers Corner Autumn Gold Curling Classic. In Grand Slam play, they made the quarterfinals at the Masters and the semifinals of the Tour Challenge, National and Canadian Open. They had two more playoff appearances on tour at the Red Deer Curling Classic, where they lost in the quarterfinals, and the Karuizawa International, where they lost the final to Anna Sidorova. For the first time in four seasons, Team Fujisawa won the Japan Curling Championships, defeating Seina Nakajima in the final. The team was set to represent Japan at the 2020 World Women's Curling Championship before the event got cancelled due to the COVID-19 pandemic. The Japanese Championship would be their last event of the season as both the Players' Championship and the Champions Cup Grand Slam events were also cancelled due to the pandemic.

Team Fujisawa played in no World Curling Tour events during the abbreviated 2020–21 season as there were no events held in Japan or Asia. The team would compete in their national championship, held from February 7–14, 2021 in Wakkanai, Hokkaido, as the defending champions. After an unblemished 6–0 round robin record, the team defeated Team Sayaka Yoshimura of Hokkaido Bank to advance to the final where they would once again face Yoshimura. Down one in the tenth, Team Yoshimura scored two points to win the national championship 7–6 over Team Fujisawa. This meant that once again, the team would not get to represent Japan at the World Championships. Team Fujisawa ended their season at the 2021 Champions Cup and 2021 Players' Championship Grand Slam events, which were played in a "curling bubble" in Calgary, Alberta, with no spectators, to avoid the spread of the coronavirus. The team had quarterfinal finishes at both events, losing out to Rachel Homan at the Champions Cup and Anna Hasselborg at the Players'.

In their first event of the 2021–22 season, Team Fujisawa finished runner-up at the 2021 Hokkaido Bank Curling Classic. They then played in the 2021 Japanese Olympic Curling Trials, which were held in a best-of-five contest between the Fujisawa and Sayaka Yoshimura rinks. After losing the first two games, Team Fujisawa rattled off three straight victories to win the trials and earn the right to represent Japan at the 2021 Olympic Qualification Event. There, the team finished third in the round robin and then defeated South Korea to secure their spot in the 2022 Winter Olympics. At the Games, Team Fujisawa led Japan to a 5–4 round robin record, enough to qualify as the fourth seeds in the playoff round. They then defeated the number one seeds in Switzerland's Silvana Tirinzoni to advance to the Olympic final, where they would face Great Britain's Eve Muirhead. The team could not keep their momentum going in the final, however, dropping the match 10–3, earning the silver medal. Elsewhere on tour for the season, Team Fujisawa lost in the final of the 2021 Curlers Corner Autumn Gold Curling Classic after a previously undefeated record. In November, they went undefeated to claim the Red Deer Curling Classic. In Grand Slam play, they only qualified in one of three events they played in, the 2022 Players' Championship, where they reached the quarterfinals. The team wrapped up their season at the 2022 Japan Curling Championships. There, they went 7–1 through the round robin and won the 1 vs. 2 page playoff game over Hokkaido Bank. They then defeated the Ikue Kitazawa's Chubu Electric Power team 7–3 in the final to claim the national title.

Personal life
Yoshida is an office worker at the Kitami Dermatology Clinic. She currently lives in Tokoro. She is the sister of curler Chinami Yoshida.

Teams

References

External links

1993 births
Living people
Japanese female curlers
Sportspeople from Hokkaido
People from Kitami, Hokkaido
Continental Cup of Curling participants
Asian Games medalists in curling
Curlers at the 2017 Asian Winter Games
Medalists at the 2017 Asian Winter Games
Asian Games bronze medalists for Japan
Curlers at the 2018 Winter Olympics
Curlers at the 2022 Winter Olympics
Olympic curlers of Japan
Medalists at the 2018 Winter Olympics
Medalists at the 2022 Winter Olympics
Olympic silver medalists for Japan
Olympic bronze medalists for Japan
Olympic medalists in curling
Pan Continental curling champions
Pacific-Asian curling champions
20th-century Japanese women
21st-century Japanese women